Jimmy Walker is a male former international table tennis player from England. He started playing at Ormesby table tennis club and was a member of the European Club Championship winning team in 1972.

As a junior he reached the final of the English Junior Open beating the top seed Ingemar Vikstrom in the semi final, only to lose in the final to Manfred Baum of Germany. He was also a member of the bronze medal winning team in the European Junior Championships in Ostend in 1971.
Career highlights:- Commonwealth Championships - Gold medal in team event in Melbourne 1975, Siver medal in team event Guernsey 1977, 1 gold and 3 silver medals in Scotland 1979 - gold in the mixed doubles and silver in the men's team event, men's singles and men's doubles 
Winner of men's singles Lisbon Open 1973 
Twice winner of men's singles Scottish Open 
Winner of Irish Open men's singles 1979 and twice winner of Irish Open mixed doubles with his wife, Irish International Karen Walker (nee Senior)

Table tennis career
He represented England at the 1975 World Table Tennis Championships in the Swaythling Cup (men's team event) with Desmond Douglas, Nicky Jarvis, Denis Neale and Trevor Taylor.

He won the English National Table Tennis Championships men's doubles title in 1979 with Desmond Douglas.

Personal life
He married Karen Senior, a table tennis player formerly ranked number one in Ireland.

See also
 List of England players at the World Team Table Tennis Championships

References

English male table tennis players
1954 births
Living people